John Bennett Tunbridge (17 November 1850 – 6 October 1928) was a notable New Zealand police commissioner and local body politician. He was born in New Romney, Kent, England, in 1850.

References

1850 births
1928 deaths
New Zealand police officers
English emigrants to New Zealand
Local politicians in New Zealand